The Toronto Rock are a lacrosse team based in Toronto playing in the National Lacrosse League (NLL). The 2001 season was the 4th in franchise history and 3rd as the Rock.

The Rock continued its dynasty on top of the NLL standings, finishing first in its division for the third straight year. The Rock beat the Washington Power in the semifinals, to advance to the championship game.  However they lost to the Philadelphia Wings and failed in their attempt at three consecutive championships.

Regular season

Conference standings

Game log
Reference:

Playoffs

Game log
Reference:

Player stats

Runners (Top 10)

Note: GP = Games played; G = Goals; A = Assists; Pts = Points; LB = Loose Balls; PIM = Penalty minutes

Goaltenders
Note: GP = Games played; MIN = Minutes; W = Wins; L = Losses; GA = Goals against; Sv% = Save percentage; GAA = Goals against average

Awards

Roster

See also
2001 NLL season

References

External links
 

Toronto
2001 in Toronto